Angel Heart is a Japanese animated television series produced by North Stars Pictures and TMS Entertainment based on the manga of the same title by Tsukasa Hojo. It aired on Yomiuri Television and Nippon Television affiliates from October 2005 to September 2006, lasting 50 episodes.

Episode Listing

References

Angel Heart
City Hunter